Chapter I: A New Beginning is the third album by Canadian pop rock group the Moffatts, and the first to be released on a major label. The album was released in Canada in 1998, with the American version released the next year. The album was very successful in Southeast Asia, and the band gained moderate success worldwide. The album was also certified platinum by the CRIA with sales of over 100,000 copies across Canada.

Track listing

Canadian version
 "Wild At Heart" – 3:25
 "Miss You Like Crazy" – 3:49 	
 "Say'n I ♥ U" – 2:27 	
 "Girl of My Dreams" – 3:39 	
 "Crazy" – 3:36 	
 "Don't Walk Away" – 3:03 	
 "Now And Forever" – 3:18 	
 "Love" – 3:09 	
 "I'll Be There for You" – 4:16 	
 "Girl I'm Gonna Get You" – 3:47 	
 "We Are Young" – 3:41 	
 "If Life Is So Short" – 4:02 	
 "Jump" – 4:10 	
 (Hidden track) "Frustration" - 3:21

US version
 "Until You Loved Me" – 3:27
 "Misery" – 4:50
 "Miss You Like Crazy" – 3:25	
 "Written All Over My Heart" - 3:48
 "Girl of My Dreams" – 3:39
 "Crazy" – 3:39
 "Say'n I ♥ U" – 2:29
 "Love" – 3:10
 "I'll Be There For You" – 4:16
 "Wild at Heart" – 3:25
 "Raining in My Mind – 4:21
 "If Life Is So Short" – 4:02

UK version
 "Crazy" – 3:36
 "Girl of My Dreams" – 3:39
 "Miss You Like Crazy" – 3:49 
 "Wild at Heart" – 3:25
 "If Life Is So Short" – 4:02 	
 "I'll Be There For You" – 4:16
 "Don't Walk Away" – 3:03 	
 "Jump" – 4:10
 "Love" – 3:09
 "Now And Forever" – 3:18 
 "Say'n I ♥ U" – 2:27 	
 "We Are Young" – 3:41 
 "Girl I'm Gonna Get You" – 3:47

Tour Souvenir Package
 "Miss You Like Crazy" (Tom Lord-Alge Remix) – 3:25
 "Crazy" (Tom Lord-Alge Remix) – 3:39
 "I'll Be There For You" (Tom Lord-Alge Remix) – 4:16
 "Girl of My Dreams" (Tom Lord-Alge Remix) – 3:39
 "If Life Is So Short" (Tom Lord-Alge Remix) – 4:02
 "Ya Ya - 3:02
 "Girls of the World" - 2:54
 "Lara" (My Love) - 4:14
 "If Life Is So Short" (Live) - 8:27
 "Say'n I ♥ U" (Live Version) - 2:34

Chapter I: A New Beginning LIVE - Live in Spain
 "Crazy"
 "Girl of My Dreams"
 "Say'n I ♥ U"
 "She Loves You"
 "Won't Back Down"
 "I'll Be There For You"
 "Don't Judge This Book"
 "I"
 "Love"
 "I'll Never Know"
 "Misery"
 "If Life Is So Short"
 "Wild at Heart"
 "Miss You Like Crazy"
 "Shine"

Other tracks
 "I" (Demo) - 3:31
 "Over The Rainbow" - 3:00
 "I'll Never Know" (Demo) - 3:55
 "Let's Party" - 3:17
 "She Said" - 3:47
 "All I Need Is You" 4:37
 "Destiny" 4:12

Chart positions

Sales and Certifications

References

1998 albums
Capitol Records albums
EMI Records albums
The Moffatts albums